Duthiastrum is a genus of plants in the Iridaceae. It contains only one species, Duthiastrum linifolium, endemic to South Africa (Cape Provinces, Free State, Northern Provinces).

References

Iridaceae
Monotypic Iridaceae genera
Flora of the Cape Provinces
Flora of the Free State
Flora of the Northern Provinces